Walking Figure is an outdoor sculpture by Donald Baechler, located at Francis S. Gabreski Airport in Suffolk County, New York, in the United States.  The  aluminum statue has received a mixed reception.

References

External links

 
 
 
 

2014 establishments in New York (state)
2014 sculptures
Aluminum sculptures in New York (state)
Outdoor sculptures in New York (state)
Statues in New York (state)
Suffolk County, New York